The 1989 Clemson Tigers football team represented Clemson University in the 1989 NCAA Division I-A football season. The Tigers were led by head coach Danny Ford, who was serving his final season as head coach at Clemson. The Tigers played their home games in Memorial Stadium.  The Tigers finished the 1989 season with a 10–2 record and defeated West Virginia 27–7 in the 1989 Gator Bowl.

Incoming recruiting class
Source:

 Nick Blinsky (C; Struthers, Ohio; Struthers HS)
 Rodney Blunt (TB; Pensacola, Florida; Pine Forest HS)
 Brentson Buckner (MG; Columbus, Georgia; Carver HS)
 Greg Burk (FB; Lawton, Oklahoma; Lawton HS)
 Pat Burris (DB; Rock Hill, South Carolina; Northwestern HS)
 Arthur Bussie (OLB; Camden, New Jersey; Camden HS)
 Darren Calhoun (LB; McCormick, South Carolina; McCormick HS)
 Jason Davis (WR; Pensacola, Florida; Pine Forest HS)
 Steve Derriso (LB; Huntsville, Alabama; Grissom HS)
 Garth Fennigan (QB; Harlingen, Texas; Harlingen HS)
 Eric Geter (CB; Newnan, Georgia; Newnan HS)
 Tyrone Gibson (LB; Hartsville, South Carolina; Hartsville HS)
 Rudy Harris (TB; Brockton, Massachusetts; Brockton HS)
 David Hogue (OG; New Castle PA; Laurel HS)
 Brent LeJeune (OT; Lake Charles, Louisiana; Barbe HS)
 Richard Moncrief (QB; Montgomery, Alabama; Davis HS)
 Robert O'Neal (CB; Clarkston, Georgia; Clarkston HS)
 Thad Ridgley (FB; Ambridge, Pennsylvania; Ambridge HS)
 Larry Ryans (CB; Greenwood, South Carolina; Greenwood HS)
 Stacy Seegars (MG; Kershaw, South Carolina; Andrew Jackson HS)
 Ashley Sheppard (OLB; Greenville, North Carolina; North Pitt HS)
 Tyrone Simpson (DT; Rock Hill, South Carolina; Northwestern HS)
 Terry Smith (WR; Clemson, South Carolina; Daniel HS)
 Daniel Telley (OLB; Anderson, South Carolina; T.L.Hanna HS)
 Franklin Thomas (TE; New Orleans, Louisiana; St. Augustine HS)
 James Trapp (SS; Lawton, Oklahoma; Lawton HS)
 Scott Vaughn (OT; Phillipsburg, New Jersey; Phillipsburg HS)
 Pierre Wilson (DT; Jackson, Mississippi; Provine HS)

Schedule

Roster

Depth chart
Source:

Coaching staff
Danny Ford – Head Coach
Chuck Reedy – Offensive Coordinator/Quarterbacks
Bill Oliver – Defensive Coordinator/Inside Linebackers
 – Co-Defensive Coordinator/Defensive Backs
 – Assistant Head Coach/Tackles & Tight Ends
 – Associate Head Coach/Offensive Guards and Centers
 – Defensive Tackles
 – Running Backs/Special Teams
 – Defensive Ends
Woody McCorvey – Recruiting Coordinator/Wide Receivers

References

Clemson
Clemson Tigers football seasons
Gator Bowl champion seasons
Clemson Tigers football